is a former Japanese football player.

Playing career
Igarashi was born in Iwate Prefecture on October 24, 1965. After graduating from high school, he joined Furukawa Electric (later JEF United Ichihara) in 1984. He played many matches from 1985 and the club won the championship for the 1985–86 Japan Soccer League and 1986 JSL Cup. In Asia, the club won the championship at the 1986 Asian Club Championship. This was the first Asian championship by a Japanese club. He played for the club until 1996. In 1997, he moved to the Regional Leagues club Yokogawa Electric. The club was promoted to the new Japan Football League in 1999. He retired at the end of the 2000 season.

Club statistics

References

External links

helvetica.mods.jp

1965 births
Living people
Association football people from Iwate Prefecture
Japanese footballers
Japan Soccer League players
J1 League players
Japan Football League players
JEF United Chiba players
Tokyo Musashino United FC players
Association football defenders